WEJF is a Christian radio station licensed to Palm Bay, Florida, broadcasting on 90.3 MHz FM.  The station serves the Palm Bay-Melbourne area, and is owned by Florida Public Radio, Inc.

References

External links
WEJF's official website

EJF
Palm Bay, Florida
1992 establishments in Florida
Radio stations established in 1992